Life & Love (or Life & Love – His 20 Greatest Songs) is a greatest hits album by Greek singer Demis Roussos, released in 1978 on Philips Records.

Commercial performance 
The album spent 11 weeks in the UK albums chart, peaking at no. 29.

Track listing

Charts

Certifications

References

External links 
 Demis Roussos – Life & Love at Discogs

1978 compilation albums
Demis Roussos albums
Philips Records albums